Jean Van Steen (2 June 1929 – 28 February 2013) was a Belgian former international footballer who played as a midfielder.

Career
Van Steen played club football for Willebroekse SV and Anderlecht.

He earned a total of five caps for Belgium between 1951 and 1954, and participated at the 1954 FIFA World Cup.

References

1929 births
2013 deaths
Belgian footballers
Belgium international footballers
1954 FIFA World Cup players
Association football midfielders